Parasteridium is a genus of fungi within the Meliolaceae family. The genus was first described by Spegazzini in 1923.

References

Meliolaceae